Sund may refer to:

Places
In northern Europe, there are more than a hundred straits named Sund, see: Sound (geography).

Sund, Åland, a municipality in Finland
Sund, Norway, a former municipality in Vestland county, Norway
Sund, Hemnes, a village in Hemnes municipality, Nordland county, Norway
Sund, Faroe Islands, a town in the Faroe Islands
Sund, Trosa, a village in Trosa Municipality, Sweden
Sund, Ydre, a hamlet in Ydre Municipality, Sweden
Øresund, a strait between the Baltic Sea and the North Sea
Sunds, Denmark

People
 Al Sund (1902–1951), American boxer
 Lenny Sund (1904–1972), American boxer
 Steven Sund, former chief of the United States Capitol Police

Other uses
Sudden unexplained nocturnal death, a type of Sudden arrhythmic death syndrome